Campeonato Brasiliense is the football league of the Federal District, Brazil. It is organized by the Distrito Federal Football Federation.

Teams from other states can be affiliated to the Distrito Federal Football Federation (FFDF) as long as they are located within 200 km from Brasília. This is the case of  Associação Atlética Luziânia from the state of Goiás and Unaí Esporte Clube from the state of Minas Gerais.

Format
First Division 2017

First stage
Top four qualify for Second Stage; bottom two relegated.
Double round-robin, in which all teams from one group play home-and-away games against all teams within the group.

Second stage
Double round-robin.
Top two are finalists.

Final
Two-legged final.

As in any other Brazilian football championship, the format can change every year.

2022 members

List of champions

Notes

Dom Pedro II is the currently Real Brasília FC.

Titles by team
Teams in bold stills active.

See also
Campeonato Brasiliense Second Division
Campeonato Brasiliense Third Division

External links
FBF Official Website 
RSSSF Website

 
Brasiliense